was a junior college in Asahi-ku, Osaka, Japan, and was part of the Osaka Institute of Technology network.

The Junior College was founded in 1950 as daytime course.

Educational institutions established in 1950
Educational institutions disestablished in 2007
Defunct private universities and colleges in Japan
1950 establishments in Japan
2007 disestablishments in Japan